HMC Seeker is a Border Agency (customs) cutter of the United Kingdom.  She was launched by Damen Shipyards in the Netherlands in 2001 and is one of four  cutters formerly operated by HM Revenue and Customs, then from 2008 she was operated by the UK Border Agency and after its dissolution in 2013 operated by the Border Force.

Prefix
The Inland Revenue and HM Customs and Excise Departments merged to form HM Revenue and Customs on 18 April 2005, and from this time customs cutters changed their prefix from "HMRC" (His Majesty's Revenue Cutter) to "HMCC" (His Majesty's Customs Cutter). Following transfer to the UK Border Agency this was shortened to the current "HMC" (His Majesty's Cutter) and a new livery applied to the fleet of cutters.

Construction
HMC Seeker is the lead ship of the Customs and Excise's fleet of 42-metre customs patrol vessels.  She was built in 2001 in Damen Shipyards in the Netherlands, and has a steel hull with an aluminium superstructure. Much effort has been expended in making her quiet to reduce crew fatigue; her engines are raft-mounted, decks throughout the ship are of a floating type, and her compartments are constructed on a box-within-a-box principle.

Her  Rigid Inflatable Boat (RIB) can be launched from her stern slipway.

Propulsion
She is fitted with twin Caterpillar 3516B DI-TA Elec engines driving twin 4-bladed controllable-pitch propellers through a pair of 3.5:1 reduction gearboxes. A single Promac bow thruster is fitted for slow speed manoeuvring in confined spaces. Electrical power is supplied by a pair of 106kWA generators.

References

Ships built in Vlissingen
Ships of the United Kingdom
2001 ships
Customs cutters of the United Kingdom